is a prominent Japanese wildlife photographer and filmmaker.

Biography
He is the son of Tokumitsu Iwagō, himself a noted wildlife photographer. After graduating from Hosei University, Iwago went as his father's assistant to the Galápagos Islands, where he decided to become a photographer. His work Letters from the Sea (Umi kara no tegami) won the Kimura Ihei Award in 1979. He is also the first Japanese photographer whose work has twice appeared on the cover of National Geographic (May 1986 and December 1994). He is now a spokesman for Olympus Corporation.

Since 2012, Iwago has appeared on the TV program "(IWASGO MITSUAKI NO SEKAI NEKOARUKI, " (NHK BS Premium). In the TV program, Iwago is shooting videos of cats from all over the world.

Publications
Serengeti: Natural Order on the African Plain. Chronicle Books, 1987. .
In the Lion's Den. Chronicle Books, 1996. .
Priceless: The Vanishing Beauty of a Fragile Planet, coauthored with Bradley Trevor Greive, Andrews McMeel, 2003. .
Tabi yukeba neko. Nihon Shuppansha, 2005. .

References

External links
 Profile - by Olympus
 Global Warming Witness - Mitsuaki Iwago Special - by Olympus
 Mitsuaki Iwago Photo Gallery - by AnimalsandEarth

1950 births
Living people
People from Tokyo
Japanese photographers
Nature photographers
Hosei University alumni